Graffenrieda robusta is a species of plant in the family Melastomataceae. It is endemic to Peru.

References

Endemic flora of Peru
robusta
Data deficient plants
Taxonomy articles created by Polbot
Taxa named by Alfred Cogniaux